Tentax makasi is a moth of the family Erebidae first described by Michael Fibiger in 2011. It is found in Indonesia (Sulawesi).

The forewings are light grey, with brown subterminal and terminal areas, including the fringes. The costa is basally black, subapically with small, black dots. The crosslines are weakly defined, except the prominent, black antemedial line. The terminal line is weakly indicated by black interveinal dots. The hindwings are grey with an indistinct discal spot. The underside of the forewings is unicolorous light brown and the underside of the hindwings is grey with an indistinct discal spot.

References

Micronoctuidae
Moths described in 2011